Angela Walton Moseley is currently serving in the Missouri Senate from the 13th District, she won her election in the 2020 Missouri State Senate Election, and she succeeded fellow Democrat Gina Walsh.

Walton Mosley’s husband Jay is a member of the Missouri House of Representatives from the 68th District.

Electoral history

State Senate

References

Living people
21st-century American politicians
Democratic Party Missouri state senators
Women state legislators in Missouri
Year of birth missing (living people)
21st-century American women politicians